The AN/ALR-67 radar warning receiver is designed to warn an aircraft's crew of potentially hostile radar activity.  It is an airborne threat warning and countermeasures control system built to be successor to the United States Navy's AN/ALR-45.  Northrop Grumman Corporation's Electronic Systems sector (Rolling Meadows, Illinois) was the main contractor for the AN/ALR-67(V) and (V)2. Raytheon Electronic Warfare Systems (Goleta, California) was the main contractor for the AN/ALR-67(V)3.

Northrop Grumman AN/ALR-67(V) and AN/ALR-67(V)2 
The AN/ALR-67 countermeasures warning and control system is the standard threat warning system for tactical aircraft and was specifically designed for the A-6E/SWIP, AV-8B, F-14B, F-14D and F/A-18.  The system detects, identifies and displays radars and radar-guided weapon systems in the C to J frequency range (about 0.5 to 20 GHz).  The system also coordinates its operation with onboard fire-control radars, datalinks, jammers, missile detection systems and anti-radiation missiles.

The AN/ALR-67(V)2 comprises the following units: 
 four small spiral high-band antennas to provide 360° azimuth RF coverage 
 four wideband, high-band quadrant receivers 
 a low-band array plus receiver to provide 360° azimuth low-band coverage 
 a narrowband superheterodyne receiver for signal analysis functions 
 twin CPU 
 an azimuth display unit (ADU) 
 control unit.

The AN/ALR-67(V)2 in turn has been given a significant enhancement in capability, through Engineering Change Procedure ECP-510 to the AN/ALR-67E(V)2 standard.  The AN/ALR-67E(V)2 provides additional enhancements including a 10-fold improvement in detection ranges when in the presence of a wingman's radar signals; it also incorporates inertial guidance system (INS) stabilisation for accurate display in high g manoeuvres and during high roll maneuvers.

The designation ALR-67B(V)2 is in connection with the ALR-67 systems fitted to Spain's EF-18 and Canadian's CF-18 aircraft.

Over 1,600 AN/ALR-67(V) and AN/ALR-67(V)2 systems have been sold.  The AN/ALR-67(V) has been supplied to the U.S. Navy and U.S. Marine Corps and the air forces of Australia, Canada, Finland, Kuwait, Malaysia, Spain and Switzerland.

Raytheon AN/ALR-67(V)3 
The AN/ALR-67(V)3 is commonly referred to as the Advanced Special Receiver (ASR) set. The receiver electronics unit has been upgraded to a fully channelized digital architecture with dual 32-bit processors, yet with an overall reduction in system size and weight. The Azimuth Display Indicator (ADI) is a 3 in (76.2 mm) diameter CRT or LCD cockpit display, carried over from the AN/ALR-67(V)2, used to show intercepted threats. The AN/ALR-67(V)3 also forms part of the electronic countermeasures programme, including an interface to the ALE-50 towed decoy system.

In August 1999, Raytheon was awarded an initial contract for full-rate production of the AN/ALR-67(V)3 for the U.S. Navy F/A-18E/F Super Hornet, totalling 34 complete installations, together with 40 spare quadrant receivers and five countermeasures receivers. These were delivered during 2001–02. Further production contracts followed, with the latest in April 2005, where Raytheon received its seventh production contract for 42 systems totalling US$44 million. This contract brought total orders to 284 receivers plus spares.

It was reported on 13 September 2006 that the Australian Defence minister has accepted a recommendation to stop development of the ALR-2002 for the F/A-18, the RAAF will most likely install the ALR-67V(3) instead.

On 3 August 2007, Deagel.com reported that the Defense Security Cooperation Agency notified Congress of a possible foreign military sale to Canada of AN/ALR-67(V)3 radar warning receivers as well as associated equipment and services. The total value, if all options are exercised, could be as high as $209 million. This notice of a potential sale is required by law; it does not mean that the sale has been concluded.

Other variants

A variant of this system, designated AN/ALR-67(V)4, was included in a proposed upgrade for the F-14A but was never implemented due to the retirement of those aircraft in the United States.

External links 
 AN/ALR-67 at FAS
 EW Programs
 Northrop Grumman product information on the ALR-67(V)2
 Raytheon product information on the ALR-67(V)3

References 

Radar warning receivers
Electronic warfare equipment
Military electronics of the United States
Raytheon Company products
Radiofrequency receivers
Equipment of the United States Air Force